Papineau station is a Montreal Metro station in the borough of Ville-Marie in Montreal, Quebec, Canada. It is operated by the Société de transport de Montréal (STM) and serves the Green Line. It is one of two Metro stations that service Montreal's Gay Village, part of the Centre-Sud district. It opened on October 14, 1966, as part of the original network of the Metro. It briefly served as the terminus of the Green Line until Frontenac station opened two months later.

Overview 
Designed by Bolduc et Venne, it is a normal side platform station, built in tunnel. A transept leads to a long set of stairways to the entrance, located in the centre of a public square. The temporary entrance building was recently replaced by a new permanent one, designed by Mario Bibeau.

Architecture and art 

The station features a set of three murals by Jean Cartier and George Juhasz at the transept level. Entitled Les Patriotes de 1837–1838, these tell the story of the Patriotes Rebellion and commemorate Louis-Joseph Papineau, the famous son of this station's namesake. Also, the redevelopment of the square around the station's entrance included the addition of a sculpture, Révolutions, by Michel de Broin.

Origin of the name
Papineau takes its name from nearby av. Papineau, named for Joseph Papineau, a notary, surveyor, politician, and defender of the rights of the people and of the French language. His son, Louis-Joseph Papineau, led the Patriotes Rebellion, the Lower Canadian portion of the Rebellions of 1837.

Connecting bus routes

Nearby points of interest
 The Village
 Jacques Cartier Bridge
 Édifice de la sécurité publique
 CFCF-DT / CTV studios
 CFJP-DT / Noovo studios
 RDS studios
 CFTM-DT / TVA studios
 Sonolab
 Confédération des syndicats nationaux
 Télé-Québec
 Téléport de Montréal
 Hôpital Notre-Dame

References

External links

 Papineau Metro Station - official site
 Montreal by Metro, metrodemontreal.com - photos, information, and trivia
 2011 STM System Map
 2011 Downtown System Map
 Metro Map

Green Line (Montreal Metro)
Railway stations in Canada opened in 1966
Centre-Sud